Steven Boghos Derounian (April 6, 1918 – April 17, 2007) was a Republican Congressman of Armenian-American descent. He represented Long Island, New York for six terms from 1953 to 1965.

Early life and education
Derounian was born in Sofia in the Kingdom of Bulgaria to Armenian parents Boghos Derounian and Eliza Aprahamian. When he was three, his family left Bulgaria with his two other brothers (one of whom was the journalist Avedis Boghos Derounian, better known as John Roy Carlson) to the United States and settled in Mineola, New York.

As a young man, Derounian helped at his father's store. In an anecdote recounted from this time, a customer complained that the 20-year-old Derounian overweighed a shipment of cheese, and his father rebuked him. The young Derounian apologized, but his father shot back:

"You made a mistake, and you're sorry. That's what every dishonest person says when he's caught. Sure, I know you didn't mean to do the wrong thing, but who else knows it? A reputation for honesty is one thing money can't buy. It can be preserved only by not making mistakes, not by making apologies. You remember that, boy, as long as you live."

He attended the public schools and graduated from New York University in 1938 and from Fordham University Law School in 1942.

Career
He was admitted to the New York bar in 1942 and began practice in Mineola the same year. Derounian entered the United States Army as a private in July 1942 and graduated from officers school as an Infantry officer and was assigned to the 327th Infantry. He served overseas from October 1944 to March 1946 and separated from the service as a captain in May 1946. He was awarded the Purple Heart and the Bronze Star with oak leaf.

Politics
He was elected as a Republican to the Eighty-third and to the five succeeding Congresses (January 3, 1953 – January 3, 1965).

As a Congressman, Derounian was part of the Congressional Subcommittee that investigated the 1950s Quiz show scandals.  This event is presented in Robert Redford's 1994 film Quiz Show, where Derounian is shown harshly criticizing Charles Van Doren, after he admits to cheating on the TV game show Twenty-One.  When his fellow Congressmen praised Van Doren for his statement, Derounian dissented, saying:

"Mr. Van Doren, I am happy that you made the statement, but I cannot agree with most of my colleagues who commended you for telling the truth, because I don't think an adult of your intelligence ought to be commended for telling the truth."

Derounian voted in favor of the Civil Rights Acts of 1957, 1960, and 1964, as well as the 24th Amendment to the U.S. Constitution.

A staunch conservative and Barry Goldwater supporter, Derounian was narrowly defeated in New York's Third Congressional District on Long Island during the LBJ landslide of 1964 Democrat Lester Wolff won 96,503 (50.7%) votes to Derounian's 93,883 (49.3%). In 1966 Derounian defeated future CIA Director William Casey in the Republican primary, but was again defeated by Rep. Wolff in November, though by an even more narrow tally of 81,959 (50.3%) to 81,122 (49.7%).

Thereafter, he served as justice of the New York Supreme Court, 1969-1981.

Retirement
He retired to Austin, Texas, saying "I think New York has gotten a little too crowded. Austin is an attractive, educational city." Derounian was additionally a professor of law at the University of Texas.

References

External links
 
 
 

1918 births
2007 deaths
United States Army personnel of World War II
American people of Armenian descent
Bulgarian emigrants to the United States
Fordham University School of Law alumni
New York (state) state court judges
New York University alumni
United States Army officers
Bulgarian people of Armenian descent
People from Mineola, New York
Republican Party members of the United States House of Representatives from New York (state)
20th-century American politicians
Ethnic Armenian politicians
20th-century American judges
University of Texas faculty